René Wendels (born 1893, date of death unknown) was a Belgian racing cyclist. He rode in the 1924 Tour de France.

References

1893 births
Year of death missing
Belgian male cyclists
Place of birth missing